Ostalo je ćutanje (Serbian Cyrillic: Остало је ћутање, trans. Silence Remains) is the thirteenth studio album from Serbian and former Yugoslav rock band Riblja Čorba.

Apart from its title, the album contains several more references to William Shakespeare's Hamlet: album features a track entitled "Nešto je trulo u državi Danskoj" ("Something's Rotten in the State of Denmark", the song itself referring to Serbia), and the album cover features the band's frontman Bora Đorđević holding a skull.

Ostalo je ćutanje is the first album recorded with the band's first official keyboardist Vladimir Barjaktarević. It is also the last album recorded with guitarist Zoran Ilić. "Odlazi od mene, ubico, idi" features former female members of Đorđević's former band Suncokret, Snežana Jandrlić, Biljana Krstić and Gorica Popović, on vocals. The song is notable for being the only Riblja Čorba song which does not feature Bora Đorđević on lead vocals. "Gastarbajterska pesma" features a passage from "Užičko kolo" played on accordion by Legende member Dušan Suvajac. The track "Ljubomorko" is a cover of John Lennon's song "Jealous Guy".

Album cover
The album cover was designed by Jugoslav Vlahović.

Track listing

Personnel
Bora Đorđević - vocals
Vidoja Božinović - guitar
Zoran Ilić - guitar
Miša Aleksić - bass guitar, producer
Vicko Milatović - drums
Vladimir Barjaktarević - keyboards, producer, recorded by, programmed by

Additional personnel
Marija Mihajlović - backing vocals
Snežana Jandrlić - vocals (on "Odlazi od mene, ubico, idi")
Gorica Popović - vocals (on "Odlazi od mene, ubico, idi")
Biljana Krstić - vocals (on "Odlazi od mene, ubico, idi")
Dušan Suvajac - accordion (on "Džigi Bau Story (Priča o Džigi Bauu)" and "Gastarbajterska pesma")
Neša Petrović - saxophone (on "Džigi Bau Story (Priča o Džigi Bauu)")
Miodrag Alabanda - violin (on "Džigi Bau Story (Priča o Džigi Bauu)")
Milan Popović - producer

References

Ostalo je ćutanje at Discogs
 EX YU ROCK enciklopedija 1960-2006,  Janjatović Petar;  
 Riblja čorba,  Jakovljević Mirko;

External links
Ostalo je ćutanje at Discogs

Riblja Čorba albums
1996 albums